The 2014 Masters (officially the 2014 Dafabet Masters) was a professional non-ranking snooker tournament that took place between 12 and 19 January 2014 at the Alexandra Palace in London, England. This was the first time that Dafabet sponsored the Masters.

Ronnie O'Sullivan set a new record by scoring 556 unanswered points in a professional event in his 6–0 quarter-final win against Ricky Walden - winning in just 58 minutes. The previous record-holder was Ding Junhui, who scored 495 unanswered points against Stephen Hendry at the 2007 Premier League Snooker.

O'Sullivan set another record by reaching his tenth Masters final, surpassing the nine appearances by Hendry, and won his fifth Masters title by defeating defending champion Mark Selby 10–4. This was the third time these two players had met in a Masters final.

Field
Defending champion Mark Selby was the number 1 seed with World Champion Ronnie O'Sullivan seeded 2. The remaining places were allocated to players based on the latest world rankings (revision 5). With O'Sullivan having a ranking of 24, Graeme Dott, ranked 16, was not invited. Robert Milkins was making his debut in the Masters.

Prize fund
The total prize money of the event was raised to £600,000 from the previous year's £500,000. The breakdown of prize money for this year is shown below:
Winner: £200,000
Runner-up: £90,000
Semi-finals: £50,000
Quarter-finals: £25,000
Last 16: £12,500
Highest break: £10,000
Total: £600,000

Main draw

Final

Century breaks
Total: 16

 138  Marco Fu
 136  Mark Davis
 134, 129  Ronnie O'Sullivan
 132, 112  Barry Hawkins
 120, 101  Judd Trump
 117  Shaun Murphy
 114  Mark Allen
 112  Stephen Maguire
 109  John Higgins
 106  Joe Perry
 104  Mark Selby
 101  Neil Robertson
 100  Ricky Walden

References

External links
 2014 Dafabet Masters – Pictures by World Snooker at Facebook

Masters (snooker)
Masters
Masters (snooker)
Masters (snooker)
Masters (snooker)